Krisjānis Kundziņš (19 March 1905 – 23 February 1993) was a Latvian wrestler. He competed in the men's Greco-Roman featherweight at the 1936 Summer Olympics.

References

External links
 

1905 births
1993 deaths
Latvian male sport wrestlers
Olympic wrestlers of Latvia
Wrestlers at the 1936 Summer Olympics
Sportspeople from Riga